Lester Holmes (born September 27, 1969, in Tylertown, Mississippi) is a former American football offensive lineman in the National Football League. He played college football at Jackson State University and was drafted in the first round of the 1993 NFL Draft.

References 

1969 births
Living people
Oakland Raiders players
Arizona Cardinals players
Philadelphia Eagles players
People from Tylertown, Mississippi
Players of American football from Mississippi
American football offensive guards
American football offensive tackles
Jackson State Tigers football players
Ed Block Courage Award recipients